Ota is a commune in the Corse-du-Sud department of France on the island of Corsica.

Population

Sights

Pianella bridge, a Genoese bridge from the 15th century
Torra di Portu

Notable Citizens

Pasquino Corso ( Ota, ? - Rome, 15 July 1532), Condottiero.

See also
Communes of the Corse-du-Sud department

References

Communes of Corse-du-Sud